Majlis-e Ahrar-e Islam, also known in short as Ahrar, is a religious Muslim political party in the Indian subcontinent that was formed during the British Raj (prior to the Partition of India) on 29 December 1929 at Lahore.

The group became composed of Indian Muslims inspired by and supporting the Khilafat Movement, which cleaved closer to the Congress Party. The party was based in Punjab and gathered support from the urban lower-middle class. Chaudhry Afzal Haq, Maulana Habib-ur-Rehman Ludhianvi, and Syed Ata Ullah Shah Bukhari were the leaders of the party.

Religious leaders from all sects Sunni Barelvi, Deobandi, Ahle Hadith, Shia Progressive and politically Communists were the members of Majlis-e-Ahrar. Chaudhry Afzal Haq, Syed Ata Ullah Shah Bukhari, Habib-ur-Rehman Ludhianvi, Mazhar Ali Azhar, Maulana Zafar Ali Khan and Dawood Ghaznavi were the founders of the party. The Ahrar was composed of Indian Muslims disillusioned by the Khilafat Movement, which cleaved closer to the Congress Party.

The party, being a member of the All India Azad Muslim Conference, is associated with opposition to Muhammad Ali Jinnah and establishment of an independent Pakistan. Syed Faiz-ul Hassan Shah was the only ahrari leader who actively participated in the Pakistan independence movement.

After 1947, it separated into the Majlis-E-Ahrar Islam Hind (مجلس احرارلأسلام ہند), based in Ludhiana and was led by descendants of Maulana Habib-ur-Rehman Ludhianvi, as well as the Majlis-e-Ahrar-e-Islam (مجلس احرارلأسلام اسلام), based in Lahore and was led by descendants of Syed Ata Ullah Shah Bukhari.

History and activities

Ideology and philosophy
Majlis-e-Ahrar-ul-Islam or simply called 'Ahrars' had an anti-imperialist, anti-feudal and Indian nationalist ideology. It worked to free India from the British rule. This party, before fading away, was highly active in Punjab Province (British India) and left an impact on major cities of Punjab like Amritsar, Lahore, Sialkot, Multan, Ludhiana and Gurdaspur.

The Majlis-e-Ahrar-e-Islam, was originally part of the failed Khilafat movement and emerged as a religio-political party after the Jallianwala Bagh massacre of 1919 and the disintegration of the Khilafat movement in 1922.

Syed Ata Ullah Shah Bukhari presided over the meeting and Maulana Mazhar Ali Azhar delivered the manifesto of an All India Majlis-e-Ahrar-e-Islam. It became first line offending party against Ahmadi Muslims by declaring that their objectives were to guide the Muslims of India on matters of nationalism as well as religion. Ahrar spearheaded the movement to have Ahmadi Muslims officially declared as non-Muslims.

By the early 1930s, the Majlis-e-Ahrar-e-Islam (hereafter called Ahrars) had become an important political party of Muslims in the Punjab. The activists' agitation centered on the princely states, and was predicated on mobilisation around socio-religious issues. Besides these campaigns, the Ahrar also participated in the mainstream political developments of British India between 1931 and 1947. Its political career can be divided into two parts; the AHRAR's response to political and constitutional issues, and its performance in electoral politics.

The Majlis-e-Ahrar-ul-Islam stood strongly against the partition of India, with its leader Afzal Haq stating that the "Partition of India is, in fact, the cry of upper classes …. It is not a communal demand as some people think but a stunt in order that the poor classes may not concentrate their thought and energies on all important questions of social and economic justice." It was a member of the All India Azad Muslim Conference, which gathered to show support for a united India.

Activism in Pakistan 
In November 2012, the Government of Pakistan banned Abdul Latif Khalid Cheema, leader of Tehreek-e-Khatme Nabuwwat and Secretary General of Majlis-e-Ahrar-e-Islam, from delivering a speech in the Chichawatni and district Sahiwal area due to the security situation in Muharram.
The president of Majlis-e-Ahrar Syed Ata-ul-Muhaimin Bukhari was also banned from delivering any speeches for three months in Multan.

In Pakistan, the party opposed the Ahmadiyya Movement. This culminated in the 1953 Lahore riots; in 1954 Majlis-e-Ahrar was banned. The associated Islamist religious movement Tehreek-e-Khatme Nabuwwat remains.

List of party leaders
Syed Ata Ullah Shah Bukhari, founder, 1st president 
Chaudhry Afzal Haq, co-founder, 2nd president, Member of the Legislative Assembly, 1934–1942
Maulana Mazhar Ali Azhar, co-founder, secretary General, Member of the Legislative Assembly, 1934–1942
Maulana Habib-ur-Rehman Ludhianvi, third President, 1942–1944
 Syed Muhammad Kafeel Bukhari, President
 Professor Khalid Shabbir Ahmad, Vice president
 Abdul Latif Khalid Cheema, Secretary General
 Mian Muhammad Awais, Secretary Information
Master Taj-ud-Din Ansari
Sheikh Hissam-ud-Din
Agha Shorish Kashmiri
Janbaz Mirza, official Ahrar historian

Notable members and leaders

Presidents
 Syed Ata Ullah Shah Bukhari, founder and first President, 1929–1930, 1946–1948
 Chaudhry Afzal Haq, second President, 1931–1934 Member of the Legislative Assembly
 Maulana Habib-ur-Rehman Ludhianvi, third President, 1935–1939
 Sheikh Hissam-ud-Din, 1939–1940, 1942–1946, 1962–1966
 Master Taj-ud-Din Ansari, 1948–1952
 Ghulam Ghaus Hazarvi, 1958
 Maulana Ubaid Ullah Ahrar, 1966–1974
 Syed Abuzar Bukhari, 1975–1978, 1993–1994
 Malik Abdul Ghafur Anwari, 1979–1980
 Mirza Muhammad Hassan Chughtai, 1981–1992
 Maulana Abdul Haq Chauhan, 1995–1997
 Syed Ata-ul-Mohsin Bukhari, 1998–1999
 Syed Ata-ul-Muhaimin Bukhari, President 1999-2021 president of Majlis-e-Ahrar-e-Islam, Pakistan
 Syed Muhammad Kafeel Bukhari,  President 2021-present

Secretary Generals
 Maulana Dawood Ghaznavi, founder, 1st Secretary General, 1929–1932
 Maulana Mazhar Ali Azhar, founder, 2nd Secretary General, 1932–1933, 1933–1938, 1941–1945 Member of the Legislative Assembly  
 Agha Shorish Kashmiri, 1939–1940, 1945 secretary Ahrar Punjab 
 Nawabzada Nasrullah Khan, 1946–1947
 Sheikh Hissam-ud-Din, 1948–1953
 Syed Abuzar Bukhari, 1962–1963, 1965–1973
 Janbaz Mirza, 1964–1965
 Chaudhry Sana Ullah Bhutta, 1973–1974
 Syed Ata-ul-Mohsin Bukhari, 1975–1983, 1990–1995
 Maulana Abdul Aleem Raipuri Shaheed, 1984–1986
 Syed Ata-ul-Momin Bukhari, 1987–1989
 Maulana Ishaq Saleemi, 1990–1995
 Professor Khalid Shabbir Ahmad, 1998–2008
 Abdul Latif Khalid Cheema, 2008–2011, 2012-today's Secretary General of Majlis-e-Ahrar-e-Islam, Pakistan

Other
 Janbaz Mirza, journalist
 Muhammad Ismail Zabeeh, Secretary, Punjab, 1937
 Syed Faiz-ul Hassan Shah, scholar
 Haji Abdul Jabar Khan Abbottabad NWFP.

See also 
 List of Deobandi organisations

References

Further reading 
 
 
 

 

Islamic organisations based in India
Islamic political parties in Pakistan
Indian independence movement
Islam in India
Sunni Islamic movements
Islamic political parties in India
Political parties established in 1930
Organisations based in Punjab, India
1930 establishments in India
Majlis-e-Ahrar-ul-Islam
Deobandi organisations